The 19th Street station was a local station on the demolished IRT Second Avenue Line in Manhattan, New York City. It had two levels. The lower level had two tracks and two side platforms and served local trains. The upper level had one track for express trains. The next stop to the north was 23rd Street. The next stop to the south was 14th Street. The station closed on June 13, 1942.

References

External links
 https://web.archive.org/web/20090130064659/http://stationreporter.net/2avl.htm

IRT Second Avenue Line stations
Railway stations closed in 1942
Former elevated and subway stations in Manhattan